Ab Anbar (also Romanized as Āb Anbār; also known as Āb Ambār) is a village in Shur Dasht Rural District, Shara District, Hamadan County, Hamadan Province, Iran. At the 2006 census, its population was 61, in 14 families.

References 

Populated places in Hamadan County